Sons of Gruumsh is an adventure module for the 3.5 edition of the Dungeons & Dragons fantasy role-playing game.

Plot summary
Sons of Gruumsh takes place in the Forgotten Realms setting, and involves six missing nobles from Melvaunt, as tribes of orcs in Thar converge on the ruined fortress of Xûl-Jarak, flocking to the banner of a charismatic warlord.

Publication history
Sons of Gruumsh was published in September 2005, and was written by Christopher Perkins, with cover art by Todd Lockwood and interior art by Mike Dubisch.

Reception
Dungeon Master for Dummies lists Sons of Gruumsh as one of the ten best 3rd edition adventures.

References

Forgotten Realms adventures
Role-playing game supplements introduced in 2005